Stanisław Kaźmierczak can refer to:

 Stanisław Kaźmierczak (footballer)
 Stanisław Kaźmierczak (field hockey)